Aspella is a genus of sea snails, marine gastropod mollusks in the family Muricidae, the murex snails or rock snails.

Species
Species within the genus Aspella include:
 Aspella aclydis Houart, 2017
 Aspella acuticostata (Turton, 1932)
 Aspella anceps (Lamarck, 1822)
 Aspella castor Radwin & D'Attilio, 1976
 Aspella cryptica Radwin & D'Attilio, 1976
 Aspella hastula (Reeve, 1844)
 Aspella helenae Houart & Tröndlé, 2008
 Aspella hildrunae Houart & Tröndle, 2008
 Aspella lorenzi Houart, 2019
 Aspella lozoueti Houart & Tröndlé, 2008
 Aspella mauritiana Radwin & D'Attilio, 1976
 Aspella media Houart, 1987
 Aspella morchi Radwin & D'Attilio, 1976
 Aspella omanensis Houart, Gori & Rosado, 2017
 Aspella platylaevis Radwin & d'Attilio, 1976
 Aspella pollux Radwin & D'Attilio, 1976
 Aspella ponderi Radwin & D'Attilio, 1976
 Aspella producta (Pease, 1861)
 Aspella pyramidalis (Broderip, 1833)
 Aspella schroederi Houart, 1996
 Aspella senex Dall, 1903
 Aspella strepta Vokes, 1985
 Aspella thomassini Houart, 1985
 Aspella vokesiana Houart, 1983
Species brought into synonymy
 Aspella bakeri Hertlein & A. M. Strong, 1951: synonym of Dermomurex bakeri (Hertlein & A. M. Strong, 1951) (original combination)
 Aspella elizabethae McGinty, 1940: synonym of Dermomurex elizabethae (McGinty, 1940) (original combination)
 Aspella paupercula (C. B. Adams, 1850): synonym of Dermomurex pauperculus (C. B. Adams, 1850)
 Aspella undata Hedley, 1907: synonym of Austroclavus undatus (Hedley, 1907) (original combination)

References

 Merle D., Garrigues B. & Pointier J.-P. (2011) Fossil and Recent Muricidae of the world. Part Muricinae. Hackenheim: Conchbooks. 648 pp. page(s): 205

External links
 Mörch O.A.L. (1877). Synopsis molluscorum marinorum Indiarum occidentalium imprimis insularum danicarum (contin.). Malakozoologische Blätter, 24: 14-66, 93-123

 
Aspellinae
Gastropod genera